The Cairns District Rugby League was formed on 5 August 1918 and is the administrative body for the game of rugby league football in Cairns, Queensland. The CDRL runs senior, junior and women's club competitions and has its headquarters at Barlow Park.

Representative teams
Selected players from the Cairns District Rugby League, represented Cairns in representative sides called Cairns Marlins (senior team), and Cairns Crocs (junior team). The Marlins compete in the Foley Shield while the Northern Pride represents Cairns in the competitions the Queensland Cup, the Cyril Connell Cup and the Mal Meninga Cup .

Senior Clubs

Cairns District Rugby League
The Cairns senior competition features eleven clubs in three grades: A-grade, reserves and colts (under 18's). All finals matches are played at Barlow Park.

Cairns District Junior Rugby League
The Cairns junior competition features twelve clubs in eleven grades, from under 6's to under 16's.

Eacham Junior Rugby League

Eacham Junior Rugby League is the governing body for seven club junior rugby league on the Atherton Tablelands. The home grounds of Eacham Junior Rugby League are the Atherton Junior Rugby League grounds. The name of the Eacham Junior Rugby League comes from a senior competition dating back to the early twentieth which comprised senior clubs from Mareeba, Atherton, Malanda and Millaa Millaa.

Innisfail Junior Rugby League

Former 4 team competition based around Innisfail now part of the CDJRL It consisted of:
 Innisfail Brothers Leprechauns, Innisfail Cowboys, Babinda Colts, Tully Tigers.

Notable players

Cairns Kangaroos
David Westley (1993-2002 Canberra Raiders, Parramatta Eels & Northern Eagles)
Justin Hodges (2000-2015 Brisbane Broncos & Sydney Roosters)
Ashley Graham (2002-2013 Parramatta Eels &  North Queensland Cowboys)
Brent Webb (2002-2014 NZ Warriors, Leeds Rhinos & Catalans Dragons)
Jayden Hodges (2013- North Queensland Cowboys & Manly-Warringah Sea Eagles)
Gideon Gela-Mosby (2017-2019 North Queensland Cowboys)

Innisfail Leprechauns
Ty Williams (2002-10 North Queensland Cowboys)
Scott Bolton (2007-19 North Queensland Cowboys)
Billy Slater (2003-18 Melbourne Storm)

Innisfail Souths
Kerry Boustead (1979-1990 Eastern Suburbs, Manly, Hull KR & North Sydney Bears)

Ivanhoes Knights
James Segeyaro (2011-19 North Queensland Cowboys, Penrith, Leeds, Cronulla & Brisbane).

Southern Suburbs
Nate Myles (2005-17 Canterbury, Sydney, Gold Coast, Manly & Melbourne Storm)

Edmonton Storm
Enari Tuala (2017- North Queensland Cowboys & Newcastle Knights)
Darryn Schonig (2020- Melbourne Storm)

See also

Rugby League Competitions in Australia

References

External links

Sport in Cairns
Rugby league competitions in Queensland
Queensland Rugby League